The 14th Kelantan State election was held on 9 May 2018, concurrently with the 2018 Malaysian general election. The previous state election was held on 5 May 2013. The state assemblymen is elected to 5 years term each.

The Kelantan State Legislative Assembly would automatically dissolve on 13 June 2018, the fifth anniversary of the first sitting, and elections must be held within sixty days (two months) of the dissolution (on or before 13 August 2018, with the date to be decided by the Election Commission), unless dissolved prior to that date by the Head of State (Sultan of Kelantan) on the advice of the Head of Government (Menteri Besar of Kelantan).

Pan-Malaysian Islamic Party (PAS) continued their domination of Kelantan government since 1990, winning 37 seats out of 45 and gaining a supermajority in the Kelantan Assembly. Barisan Nasional (BN) only won 8 seats and confirming their status as the opposition, while Pakatan Harapan is unrepresented in the assembly after all their candidates lose. Ahmad Yakob from PAS was sworn in as Menteri Besar for the second term, on 10 May 2018.

Contenders

Barisan Nasional (BN) is set to contest all 45 seats in Kelantan State Legislative Assembly. Barisan Nasional (BN) linchpin party United Malays National Organisation (UMNO) is to set to contest major share of Barisan Nasional (BN) seats.

Pan-Malaysian Islamic Party (PAS) is set to contest all 45 seats in Kelantan to defend their victory in the last election .

Pakatan Harapan have decided to contest all 45 seats in Kelantan. However, Pakatan Harapan has yet to finalize 14 seats at the moment. The seats are including Demit, Kemahang, Kemuning, Tawang and Kijang. On 1 March 2018, Pakatan Harapan has completed the distribution of seats in Kelantan. National Trust Party (Amanah) will contest in 23 seats while the Malaysian United Indigenous Party (Bersatu) will have 11 seats. People's Justice Party (PKR) will contest 10 seats while the Democratic Action Party (DAP) will contest a single seat, which is in Galas.

Parti Sosialis Malaysia (PSM) will contest in Kota Lama.

Political parties

The contested seats

Election pendulum
The 14th General Election witnessed 37 governmental seats and 8 non-governmental seats filled the Kelantan State Legislative Assembly. The government side has 6 safe seats and 5 fairly safe seats. However, none of the non-government side has safe and fairly safe seat.

Results

Seats that changed allegiance

Aftermath
Mustapa Mohamed, the MLA for Ayer Lanas and MP for Jeli, announced his departure from UMNO and BN on 18 September 2018, and become an independent. He later joined Bersatu, then a component party for PH, on 26 October 2018. This means that PH has its sole representation in Kelantan Assembly, up until March 2020, in the wake of 2020 Malaysian political crisis and exit of Bersatu from PH, Mustapa switched to the side of the government as PAS and Bersatu created a new coalition, Perikatan Nasional.

References

Kelantan state elections
Kelantan
Kelantan